German submarine U-427 was a Type VIIC U-boat of Nazi Germany's Kriegsmarine during World War II.

Design
German Type VIIC submarines were preceded by the shorter Type VIIB submarines. U-427 had a displacement of  when at the surface and  while submerged. She had two shafts and two  propellers.

U-427 was fitted with five  torpedo tubes (four fitted at the bow and one at the stern), fourteen torpedoes, one  SK C/35 naval gun, 220 rounds, and two twin  C/30 anti-aircraft guns. The boat had a complement of between forty-four and sixty.

Service history
Built by Danziger Werft, Danzig, the U-boat was laid down on 27 July 1942, launched on 6 February 1943 and commissioned on 2 June 1943 with a crew of 53 under their Austrian commander Oberleutnant Carl-Gabriel Graf von Gudenus. It survived until the end of the war. Most U-boats achieved notoriety for the number of kills they achieved, or the total tonnage of the vessels they sank, but in the case of U-427 fame was achieved in a different way.

From its first voyage, on 20 June 1944, until the end of the war, U-427 never destroyed any of its targets. In April 1945, leading up to, during, and after those two attacks, U-427 survived 678 depth charge attempts. On 2 May 1945, U-427 returned to its base at Kilbotn, Norway, where it remained for the few remaining days before Germany's surrender.

References

Bibliography

External links

German Type VIIC submarines
U-boats commissioned in 1943
World War II submarines of Germany
U-boats sunk in 1945
1943 ships
Operation Deadlight
Ships built in Danzig
Maritime incidents in December 1945